Edwin Grant Conklin (November 24, 1863 – November 20, 1952) was an American biologist and zoologist.

Life

He was born in Waldo, Ohio, the son of A. V. Conklin and Maria Hull.

He was educated at Ohio Wesleyan University and Johns Hopkins University. He was professor of biology at Ohio Wesleyan (1891–94) and professor of zoology at Northwestern University (1894–96), the University of Pennsylvania (1896-1908), and Princeton University (1908-1935).  He became coeditor of the Journal of Morphology, The Biological Bulletin, and the Journal of Experimental Zoology. He was president of the American Society of Naturalists in 1912 and president of the American Association for the Advancement of Science in 1936. He was elected a Fellow of the American Academy of Arts and Sciences in 1914. He also served on the board of trustees for Science Service, now known as Society for Science and the Public, from 1937 to 1952. In 1943 Conklin was awarded the John J. Carty Award from the National Academy of Sciences.

In 1995 the Society for Developmental Biology inaugurated the Edwin Grant Conklin Medal in his honor.

Family

He married Belle Adkinson (d.1940) in 1889.

References

Further reading 
 Conklin, Edwin (1953). Autobiographical essay in  

 
Conklin, Edwin Grant(1921). Some biological aspects of immigration |journal = Scribner's Magazine|volume=49|issue=3|pages=352–359

External links

Duty or Dream? Edwin G. Conklin's Critique of Eugenics and Support for American Individualism
National Academy of Sciences Biographical Memoir
Edwin Grant Conklin Papers from the Princeton University Library

1863 births
1952 deaths
American zoologists
Johns Hopkins University alumni
Northwestern University faculty
Ohio Wesleyan University alumni
Ohio Wesleyan University faculty
People from Marion County, Ohio
Princeton University faculty
Fellows of the American Academy of Arts and Sciences
Members of the United States National Academy of Sciences
Marine zoologists
American marine biologists
Honorary Fellows of the Royal Society of Edinburgh